The Pateliya is a Subgroup of Bhil tribe They are found in the Indian states of Gujarat, Madhya Pradesh, Rajasthan and some parts of Maharashtra and Karnataka.

History

The term 'Pateliya' has been derived from the term Patel which locally means 'headman'. 

The Pateliya are mostly distributed in Dahod Mahisagar Panchmahal districts of Gujarat and Jhabua, Dhar, Indore, Dewas, Guna districts of Madhya Pradesh. They speak Malvi among themselves and Hindi with others.

Traditional occupation of the Pateliya is agriculture. They are in Variety of governmental services on higher posts. Apart from agriculture and services, several of them also work as wage labourers. Agriculture is an important source of earning.

Rajput descent
The community has a number of exogamous clans. All the clans enjoy an equal status. The Pateliya clans have been grouped under six broader categories; they appear to have been borrowed from Rajputs. They are Parmar, Solanki, Jadav, Chauhan, Gohil and Rathor. Parmar includes Skya, Bhagat, Gangodiya Budia, Glot, Godad, Wagal, Chautar, Kochara Devaliya, Suswad and Eal, clans. Solanki consists of Jhaniya, Rojada (Rose), Nalwaya, Ananiya, Cohari, Bariya, Chopada and Hihor. Jadav consists of clans like Khaped, Bhuriya, Damor, Hathila. Chauhan includes clans like B'habhor, Pasaya, Katara, Mori, Dundawa, Dhakiya and Wawadiya. Gohil have only one clan, Gamar. Rathore includes clans like Chota and Bada. According to the Gazetteer of India (1972), "The Pateliyas found in Dohad claims Rajput descent". This is the plausible explanation for the grouping of clans under Rajput clan categories.

Present circumstances

The community is subdivided into exogamous clans such as the Hangaria, Mera, Gohari, Bhura, Bhabhor, Damor, Parmar, Jhania, Dhak, Bariya, Gohil, Rathod, Solanki, Chauhan, Nalvaya, Bhabria, Musaria, Kochara, Bhuriya, Khaped, Bamaniya and Amliar.

The community traditionally practices settled agriculture, but they are landless, or the land owned is medium and small, and insufficient to sustain them. Nowadays they are in many different government services on both higher and smaller posts. But those are poor they migrate to Kota to work in the stone quarries and to Gujrat to work in different Industries. They profess Hinduism, and worship local deities such as Devkarji, Mataji, and Kalka Devi, Baba Ghodaja, Nihal Devi, Baba Khatri.

References

Bhil
Social groups of Rajasthan
Scheduled Tribes of India
Social groups of Madhya Pradesh